The individual show jumping was an equestrian event held as part of the Equestrian at the 1912 Summer Olympics programme. The competition was held on 16 July 1912 as the Stockholm Olympic Stadium. There were 31 competitors from 8 nations. Each nation was limited to a maximum of six riders. The event was won by Jacques Cariou of France, the nation's first victory in the individual jumping. The victory came with a challenge prize presented by Count Gyula Andrássy the Younger of Hungary. Rabod von Kröcher earned Germany's first medal in the event with his silver. Emmanuel de Blommaert of Belgium took bronze.

Background

This was the second appearance of the event, which had first been held at the 1900 Summer Olympics and has been held at every Summer Olympics at which equestrian sports have been featured (that is, excluding 1896, 1904, and 1908). It is the oldest event on the current programme, the only one that was held in 1900.

Chile, Germany, Great Britain, Norway, and Sweden each made their debut in the event. Belgium, France, and Russia all competed for the second time, having previously appeared at the first competition in 1900.

Competition format

The 1,533 metre course consisted of 19 jumps (15 physical obstacles, 4 of which were jumped twice). Each jump had a maximum of 10 points, so the total possible was 190 points. Long jump obstacles had a maximum distance of 4 metres. The maximum height of jumps was 1.4 metres. 

The deductions possible were: 2 points for a first refusal, 4 for a second, 6 for a third; 4 points for a horse falling; 6 points for the rider being unseated; 1 point for touching the obstacle without knocking it down; 4 points for knocking an obstacle down with the horse's fore legs, 2 points for knocking it down with the hind legs; 1 point for landing with hind legs on the end line of a long jump, 2 points for the hind legs inside the end line (or touching the surface of the water) or the fore legs on the line, 4 points for the fore legs inside the end line (or touching the water); and 2 points for every 5 seconds over the time limit of 3:50.0 (400 metres per minute).

Only "gentlemen" were permitted. Thus, professionals, women, and non-commissioned officers were ineligible. Military school horses were excluded, but all other horses were allowed.

Schedule

Results

3 minutes and 50 seconds were allotted. 190 points was the maximum score.

The jump-off for the gold medal used a shortened course of only 6 obstacles. Cariou had 5 faults throughout the jump-off, while von Kröcher had 7.

References

Sources
 
 

Equestrian at the 1912 Summer Olympics